"Back in Blood" is a song by American rapper Pooh Shiesty featuring fellow American rapper Lil Durk. It was released through Atlantic Records and 1017 Records on November 6, 2020, as the lead single from the former's debut mixtape, Shiesty Season (2021), and two days before his twenty-first birthday. The two artists wrote the song alongside its producer, YC. The song marks the first collaboration between the two artists, and they later reunited in 2021 on Lil Durk's song "Should've Ducked", a track off of the deluxe edition of his sixth studio album, The Voice.

Commercial performance
"Back in Blood" debuted at number 93 on the Billboard Hot 100. It later peaked at number 13. The song marks Pooh Shiesty's first song to enter the chart and his highest-charting song, while also serving as Lil Durk's second highest-charting song, following his feature on Canadian rapper Drake's single "Laugh Now Cry Later", which debuted and peaked at number 2, it was released on August 14, 2020. On February 22, 2021, the song was certified gold.

Live performances
On February 11, 2021, Pooh Shiesty performed a piano version of "Back in Blood" (without Lil Durk) alongside "Guard Up", two songs from his mixtape, live on Audiomack. He performed the two songs again live on Vevo CTRL on February 26, 2021. Shiesty performed the song on April 14, 2021, on The Tonight Show Starring Jimmy Fallon, with Durk assisting him.

Remixes
Remixes of "Back in Blood" have been performed by Asian Doll, Cupcakke, Pooh Shiesty's labelmate K Shiday and Joyner Lucas.

Credits and personnel
Credits adapted from Tidal.

 Pooh Shiesty – lead vocals, songwriting
 Lil Durk – featured vocals, songwriting
 YC – production, songwriting
 Skywalker Og – mixing, mastering, engineering

Charts

Weekly charts

Year-end charts

Certifications

Release history

References

External links
 

2020 singles
2020 songs
Atlantic Records singles
Pooh Shiesty songs
Lil Durk songs
Songs written by Pooh Shiesty
Songs written by Lil Durk